Dizzcography is a box set released in 2010, containing all previously released material by the Danish rock band Dizzy Mizz Lizzy. The name is a portmanteau of "Dizzy" and "discography". The CD version is collected in a black printed cardboard box as four Digipak CDs and a 40-page booklet. The box set was also released in a limited press on 8 double-sided vinyl records, which was a major driver of creating this box set because the albums had not been released on vinyl previously. The box set contains four albums:
 Dizzy Mizz Lizzy (1994), digitally remastered. The cover art was completely redrawn because the original designs had not been saved.
 Rotator (1996), digitally remastered and also with redrawn cover art.
 Live in Aarhus '96, a live album which was released earlier as disc two of The Best of Dizzy Mizz Lizzy.
 The Rest of Dizzy Mizz Lizzy, a compilation album of songs from various releases:
 Track 1–4: The band's 1993 demo. Recording a demo was part of the grand prize for winning the 1993 DM i Rock contest. Produced, recorded and mixed by Flemming Hansson and Dizzy Mizz Lizzy at Sweet Silence Studios, Copenhagen in June 1993.
 Track 5–6: Two B-side tracks. "Hurry Hurry" was recorded during the sessions for Dizzy Mizz Lizzy. It appeared as a bonus track on the Japanese release, and as B-side on the "Love is a Loser's Game" single. "Pain Before My Eyes" was previously released as a bonus track on the Japanese edition of Rotator.
 Track 7–13: The band's first live album One guitar, one bass and a drummer, that's really all it takes - Live in Japan, recorded on 16 July 1995 in Osaka, which was only released on CD in Japan.

Live in Concert 2010 was released several months after Dizzcography and was not included in the box set.

Track listing

Personnel 
Dizzy Mizz Lizzy
 Tim Christensen – guitar, vocals, songwriter, executive producer, co-producer (disc 2 and 4), compiler (disc 4), original cover art (disc 3)
 Martin Nielsen – bass, compiler (disc 4)
 Søren Friis – drums, compiler (disc 4)
Production
 Dizzy Mizz Lizzy – arranger, compiler, mixer, producer (disc 1, 1993 demo, B-sides)
 Nick Foss – producer (disc 1, 2, B-sides, Live in Japan), mixer (disc 1–3, B-sides, Live in Japan)
 Lars Overgaard – co-producer (disc 2 and 4), engineer (disc 1 and 2), mixer (disc 1–3, B-sides, Live in Japan)
 Rune Nissen-Petersen – engineer (disc 3)
 Flemming Hansson – producer (1993 demo), mixer (1993 demo)
 Nikolaj Vinten – mastering, remastering
 Mads Nilson – recorded by (Live in Japan)
 Peter Brander – recorded by (Live In Aarhus '96)
Post-production
 Jan-Erik Stig – project manager
 Thomas Hemdorff – project manager
 Malene Garp – production
 Jan Poulsen – liner notes
 Paul Wilson – artwork, 2010 cover art
 MandOverBord – original cover art (disc 1 and 2)
 Dan Christensen – original cover art (disc 3)
 Einar vid Neyst – photography (disc 1)
 Martin Dam Kristensen – centerfold photo (disc 3)

References 

2010 compilation albums
Albums produced by Nick Foss
Dizzy Mizz Lizzy albums
EMI Records compilation albums